The Port of Palm Beach is located in Riviera Beach, Florida, United States, in Palm Beach County. The port is an independent taxing district, with a five-member board of commissioners elected at large by voters within the district. The port is administered by an Executive Director and professional staff of 59 full-time employees.

General Information
The  ship channel and 1,100-by- turning basin are in Lake Worth, and connect to the Atlantic Ocean through the Lake Worth Inlet. The Port has three slips, four marginal wharves, and two roll-on/roll-off ramps, and a cruise terminal.

The Port of Palm Beach is the fourth-busiest container port in Florida and the twentyfifth-busiest in the continental United States. In addition to intermodal capacity, the Port is a major nodal point for the shipment of bulk sugar, molasses, cement, utility fuels, water, produce and breakbulk items.  With the exception of the spiced rum brand, all Cruzan Rum is shipped from St. Croix to the Port of Palm Beach to be bottled.

In fiscal year 2019 (October, 2018 through September, 2019), the Port of Palm Beach served 1,273 cargo ships carrying more than 1.2 million short tons in approximately 280,000 TEUs, more than 2.3 million short tons of total cargo tonnage, and almost 450,000 cruise passengers.

In 2010, Celebration Cruise Line opened a 2-day cruise, every other day, to the Bahamas from the Port of Palm Beach using the nearly new passenger terminal.

Gallery

See also
 Amaryllis (ship)
 United States container ports

References

"About us". portofpalmbeach.com. Retrieved December 23, 2005.

Transportation buildings and structures in Palm Beach County, Florida
Palm Beach, Port of